Bhucanana (also Bhukhanana) is a town in the uMhlathuze Local Municipality in the KwaZulu-Natal province of South Africa.

References

Populated places in the uMhlathuze Local Municipality